Dragonetto Clavelli was a lord of Nisyros.

He married Agnese Crispo (1386–1428), daughter of Francesco I Crispo, tenth Duke of the Archipelago, and wife Fiorenza Sanudo, Lady of Milos.

References
 

Dukes of the Archipelago
Year of birth unknown
Year of death unknown
14th-century Venetian people
15th-century Venetian people